Marc Hannaford is an Australian jazz pianist. He was nominated for the ARIA Award for Best Jazz Album at the ARIA Music Awards of 2011 and at the AIR Awards of 2011 for Shreveport Stomp in 2011.

He was part of The Antripodean Collective with whom they released three albums.

Hannaford won the 2013 Music Council of Australia's Freedman Fellowship, the 2013 Jazz “Bell” award for most original album (Sarcophile), and the 2013 Australian Performing Rights Association’s Art Award for best work (“Anda Two”). 

Hannaford completed a PhD in Music Theory at Columbia University in 2019, with a dissertation on the improviser, composer, and cofounder of the Association for the Advancement of Creative Musicians, Muhal Richard Abrams.  He currently holds a Lecturer in Music Theory position at Columbia University.

Discography

Awards and nominations

AIR Awards
The Australian Independent Record Awards (commonly known informally as AIR Awards) is an annual awards night to recognise, promote and celebrate the success of Australia's Independent Music sector.

|-
| AIR Awards of 2011
|Shreveport Stomp
| Best Independent Jazz Album
| 
|-

ARIA Music Awards
The ARIA Music Awards is an annual awards ceremony that recognises excellence, innovation, and achievement across all genres of Australian music. 

|-
| ARIA Music Awards of 2011
|Shreveport Stomp
| ARIA Award for Best Jazz Album
| 
|-

Australian Jazz Bell Awards
The Australian Jazz Bell Awards, (also known as the Bell Awards or The Bells), are annual music awards for the jazz music genre in Australia. They commenced in 2003.

|-
| 2010
| Homage – Sam Anning, Allan Browne, Marc Hannaford
| Best Australian Classic Jazz Album
| 
|-
| 2013
| Sacrophile – Marc Hannaford
| Most Original Australian Jazz Album
| 
|-

wins only

References

External links
Marc Hannaford

Australian jazz pianists
Year of birth missing (living people)
Living people
21st-century pianists